Meighan Stone is an academic and political activist. She is currently serving as a senior fellow at the Council on Foreign Relations in the Women and Foreign Policy Program. Prior to this, she was the president of the Malala Fund, and a fellow at the Harvard Kennedy School's Shorenstein Center.

References

Living people
American activists
Year of birth missing (living people)